Grandfalls-Royalty Independent School District is a public school district based in Grandfalls, Texas (USA).

In addition to Grandfalls, the district also serves the unincorporated community of Royalty.

Grandfalls-Royalty ISD has one school that serves students in grades pre-kindergarten through twelve.

Academic achievement
In 2013 Grandfalls-Royalty ISD was rated "Met Standard" and received distinctions in "Academic Achievement in Reading/ELA", "Academic Achievement in Mathematics", and a "Top 25 Percent Student Progress" distinction.

Special programs

Athletics
Grandfalls-Royalty High School plays six-man football.

See also

List of school districts in Texas

References

External links
Grandfalls-Royalty ISD

School districts in Ward County, Texas